The discography of Anika Moa, a New Zealand pop singer-songwriter, consists of four studio albums, twelve solo singles, three charity singles, and fifteen music videos. Moa was a finalist in the 1998 national Smokefreerockquest, and was subsequently signed to record labels Warner Music and Atlantic Records. She recorded her debut album, Thinking Room, in New York City, which was released in 2001. It focussed on the genre of pop, with elements of folk music, and hosted the singles "Youthful", "Good in My Head", "Falling in Love Again" and "Mother". "Falling in Love Again" provided Moa with her first chart success in Australia, reaching number sixty-one on the Australian Singles Chart. Thinking Room topped the New Zealand Albums Chart and was certified double platinum by the Recording Industry Association of New Zealand (RIANZ). Stolen Hill, Moa's second studio effort, was released in 2005 and featured a darker tone, with Moa incorporating influences of rhythm and blues and swing music. The album was certified gold by the RIANZ.

In 2007 Moa signed to EMI Records and put out In Swings the Tide, which contains components of country music. It spawned four singles, including "Dreams in My Head", which peaked at number sixteen on the New Zealand Singles Chart. The album was eventually certified platinum in New Zealand. Love in Motion, released in 2010, saw Moa shift to a more pop rock and electropop environment. It produced the single "Running Through the Fire (Storm)", which briefly appeared on the New Zealand Singles Chart, as well as "Love Me Again" and "Blame It on the Rain".

Studio albums

Singles

Charity singles

Music videos

References

Discographies of New Zealand artists
Pop music discographies